Negro Wash is a stream in Gila County, Arizona, in the United States.

Negro Wash was known as Nigger Wash until the name was changed in the 1960s.

See also
 List of rivers of Arizona

References

Rivers of Gila County, Arizona
Rivers of Arizona